UFC 290 is an upcoming mixed martial arts event produced by the Ultimate Fighting Championship that will take place on July 8, 2023, at the T-Mobile Arena facility in Paradise, Nevada, part of the Las Vegas Metropolitan Area, United States.

See also 

 List of UFC events
 List of current UFC fighters
 2023 in UFC

References 

 

Ultimate Fighting Championship events
2023 in mixed martial arts
Scheduled mixed martial arts events
2023 in sports in Nevada
July 2023 sports events in the United States